Omomantis zebrata, also known by its common name zebra mantis, is a species from the genus Omomantis in the family Mantidae.

References

Mantidae